Masanga Hospital or Masanga Leprosy Hospital is a NGO supported government hospital that provides healthcare in paediatrics, maternity, general medicine and surgery. It is located in Tonkolili district, Northern Province, Sierra Leone, West Africa. The hospital was ransacked and used as a rebel stronghold during the Sierra Leone Civil War, but having reopened in 2006 it is now a functioning rural hospital once more. The hospital is run by a partnership between several European charitable organisations: Masanga UK, Sierra Leonean Adventists Abroad (SLAA), Masanga Netherlands and Masanga Denmark . Though in the long-term the hospital aims to be fully government-funded, presently it currently subsists on charitable donations. Free healthcare is offered to under fives and pregnant women, and also to locals of limited means.

Education
Masanga Hospital is involved in capacity building by serving as the primary rotation center for the Surgical training program of CapaCare and by collaborating closely with the Tonkolili District College of Health Sciences.

See also
2014 Ebola virus epidemic in Sierra Leone

References

External links
 Masanga Hospital website
 Sierra Leonean Adventists Abroad Association website
 Masanga Leprosy Hospital Website
 CapaCare

Hospitals in Sierra Leone